Clifton is a coastal beach reserve motor camp in Hawke's Bay, New Zealand. It is located eighteen kilometres southeast of the city centre of Napier and eight kilometres west of the tip of Cape Kidnappers. Clifton marks the start of the walk or ride around to the Cape Kidnappers gannet colony.

Located at Clifton is a beach reserve motor camp, a shop, a popular cafe, restaurant and bar, camping facilities, and a car park from which most visitors to Cape Kidnappers depart from. Clifton is located on Conservation Land, with the reserve being created to preserve the environment around the Cape Kidnappers for the large gannet colonies, which is a huge tourist attraction. Activities which are common include swimming, boating, sailing, kayaking and surfing.

Clifton is located at 39°S 177°E on Hawke Bay on the east coast of New Zealand. The land almost immediately behind the beach is hilly and covered with trees. Clifton is located between the hilly terrain and the beach on a narrow strip of flat land. The road which leads towards Cape Kidnappers, Clifton Road, terminates as a car park at the southern end of Clifton and is the departure point for most people visiting the Cape. It is an eight-kilometre walk along the coast from Clifton to the Cape.

As Clifton is located near the sea in an area which is highly prone to coastal erosion, it is facing severe problems with the erosion. The Clifton shoreline is constantly being cut away by stormy seas and high ocean tides. Land at Clifton is precious as there is very little of it between the sea and the high terrain. The long term shoreline retreat at Clifton Beach is on average 0.75m per year, higher than coastal erosion rates at Te Awanga and Haumoana further north along the Bay coastline.

References

External links
 Hawke's Bay Tourism

Hastings District
Beaches of the Hawke's Bay Region
Populated places in the Hawke's Bay Region
Populated places around Hawke Bay